Bagou may refer to:

 Bagou, Benin, a town and arrondissement in Alibori Department, Benin
 Bagou Station, a station on the Beijing Subway in China